The 1749 English cricket season was the sixth season following the earliest known codification of the Laws of Cricket.

Matches 
Seven eleven-a-side matches between significant teams are known to have taken place.

26 May – London & Bromley & Chislehurst v Addington – Artillery Ground
June – Hastings v Pevensey – not known
2 June – England XI v Surrey – Dartford Brent
5 June – England XI v Surrey – Artillery Ground
21 June – London v Richmond & Ripley – Artillery Ground
26 June – Long Robin's XI v Stephen Dingate's XI – Artillery Ground
14 August – London v Bearsted – Artillery Ground

Single wicket matches
A series of three single wicket cricket matches took place between teams of five playing for England against Addington. The matches resulted from a challenge by the Addington players to meet any other five in England, with Addington considered the favourites to win. Addington won only one of the matches.

First mentions

Players
 John Frame (Surrey/Dartford/Kent)

References

Bibliography

Further reading
 
 
 
 
 

1749 in English cricket
English cricket seasons in the 18th century